The Muslim Educational Association of Southern India (MEASI), formerly Madras Executive Committee of Mohamedan Educational Conference and Mohamedan Educational Association of Southern India, is a trust which strives for education among Muslim youth, especially from South India.

Establishment
The Association, established in 1902 by Muslims, was registered under the societies act XXI of 1860. It was founded as a fulfillment of the dream of Sir Syed Ahmed Khan after the annual session of Muslim Education Conference held in Madras on 28 December 1901. This conference renamed the then existing Madras Executive Committee of Mohamedan Educational Conference as the Mohamedan Educational Association of Southern India, which later came to be known as Muslim Educational Association of Southern India. The founding members of MEASI are

 Hameed Sait
 Nawab Syed Mohamed (Grand son of Tipu Sultan)
 Justice Sir Abdul Rahim
 Sir Mohamed Habibullah
 Sir Mohamed Usman
 Trichy Jamal Mohamed
 Malang Ahmed Batcha
 Quaid-E-Millath Muhammad Ismail

Function
The Association is one of the oldest minority educational institutions and is having a multi-level educational system ranging from school to Post Graduate and Research, covering several fields of studies with a sound financial resource-base.  The Association is backed by a democratic, participative management system and is under the leadership of individuals drawn from educational, industrial and other walks of life.

The trust manages The New College in the city of Chennai along with MEASI Matriculation Higher Secondary School, New College Institute of Management, MEASI Academy of Architecture, Institute of Research in Soil Biology & Bio-Technology, MEASI Urdu Academy and MEASI Institute of Information Technology, MEASI C.A. Academy.

Leadership
By 1930, the organisation came under the control of Muslims. However, the present board of trustees includes Muslims from different background.

Institutions under MEASI

References

Islamic education in India